is a JR West Geibi Line station located in Takemori, Tōjō-chō, Shōbara, Hiroshima Prefecture, Japan.

History
1955-07-20: Uchina Station opens as a station between Tōjō Station and Onuka Station
1987-04-01: Japan National Railways is privatized, and Uchina Station becomes a JR West station

Station layout
Uchina Station features three platforms. The Nariwa River, a major tributary of the Takahashi River, is located nearby. Uchina Station is one of the "hikyō stations," or a station considered secluded or less known.

Connecting lines
All lines are JR West lines.
Geibi Line
Bingo Yawata Station — Uchina Station — Onuka Station

External links
 JR West

Geibi Line
Railway stations in Hiroshima Prefecture
Railway stations in Japan opened in 1955
Shōbara, Hiroshima